Acasanga is a genus of longhorn beetles of the subfamily Lamiinae, containing the following species:

 Acasanga delectabilis (Waterhouse, 1880)
 Acasanga dimidiosanguinea (Fuchs, 1963)
 Acasanga humeralis (Waterhouse, 1880)
 Acasanga reticulata (Waterhouse, 1880)

References

Hemilophini